Joël Quiniou (born 11 July 1950) is a former football referee from France. He is best known for supervising eight matches in the FIFA World Cup, one in 1986, three in 1990 and four in 1994.

Career
He supervised eight matches in the FIFA World Cup, one in 1986, three in 1990 and four in 1994. In the group stages of the 1986 World Cup, Quiniou sent off Uruguay's Jose Batista in the first minute of the match against Scotland, after a rough tackle on Gordon Strachan.  this remains the fastest dismissal in World Cup history.
Quiniou received criticism for his performance at the 1994 FIFA World Cup Semi-final between Bulgaria and Italy. Several penalty claims by the Bulgarians were turned down, most notably when Alessandro Costacurta handled the ball inside the penalty area.

World Cup matches

Honours
Orders
Chevalier of the Légion d'honneur: 1994

References

External links
  Profile

1950 births
French football referees
FIFA World Cup referees
1990 FIFA World Cup referees
Living people
1994 FIFA World Cup referees
1986 FIFA World Cup referees
Chevaliers of the Légion d'honneur